The Njonjo Commission of Inquiry into Land Law systems  was a Kenya Government Commission established in 1999. It was focused on coming up with principles of a National Land Policy framework, the constitutional position of land and formulation of a new institutional framework for land administration. It was chaired by former  Attorney General Charles Njonjo.

References

Human rights organisations based in Kenya
Law of Kenya